Buprestis parmaculativentris is a species of metallic wood-boring beetle in the family Buprestidae. It is endemic to Texas and known from the Chisos Mountains in the Big Bend National Park.

References

Further reading

 
 
 

Buprestidae
Beetles of the United States
Endemic fauna of Texas
Beetles described in 1958
Articles created by Qbugbot